Madhunapantula (Telugu: మధునాపంతుల) is an Indian surname. Bearers of the name:
 Madhunapantula Satyanarayana Sastry, one of the eminent personalities in Telugu literature
 Madhunapantula Suryanarayana Murty, an eminent applied mathematician

Indian surnames